Louise af Forselles (1850-1934), was a Finnish philanthropist and salvationist. She was the central figure of the Christian charitable activity in contemporary Finland. She introduced the Salvation Army to Finland in 1889.

Louise af Forselles was a known Christian philanthropist in Finland with a secure position in society due to her status as a baroness. She became involved with the work of the Salvation Army during a visit to her sister in Switzerland in 1888. She was given a suggestion to introduce the army in Finland, to which she agreed. In 1889, she introduced the Salvation army in Finland.

References

 kansallisbiografia Suomen kansallisbiografia (National Biography of Finland)

1850 births
1934 deaths
19th-century Finnish nobility
Finnish philanthropists
Finnish Salvationists